Helisaeus Roeslin or Helisäus Röslin (17 January 1545 – 14 August 1616) was a German physician and astrologer who adopted a geoheliocentric model of the universe. He was one of five observers who concluded that the Great Comet of 1577 was located beyond the moon. His representation of the comet, described as "an interesting, though crude, attempt," was among the earliest and was highly complex.

Life
Roeslin was born in Plieningen (now part of Stuttgart). had known Johannes Kepler since their student days and was one of his correspondents. Roeslin placed more emphasis on astrological predictions than did Kepler, and though he respected Kepler as a mathematician, he rejected some of Kepler's cosmological principles, including Copernican theory. Kepler criticized Roeslin's predictions in his book De stella nova, on the comet of 1604, and the two kept up their arguments in a series of pamphlets written as dialogues.

Roeslin's 1597 book De opere Dei creationis is regarded as one of the major works in the late 16th-century controversy over the formulation of a geoheliocentric world system. Robert Burton refers to Roeslin in his Anatomy of Melancholy.

Roeslin was physician-in-ordinary to the count palatine of Veldenz and the count of Hanau-Lichtenberg in Buchsweiler in Alsace.

He made a prediction that the world would end in 1654 based on the appearance of a new star in 1572.

After Roeslin's death at Buchsweiler in 1616, his unpublished astrology, theology and kabbalistic work merged into the manuscript collection of Karl Widemann.

References

Further reading
Akerman, Susanna. Rose Cross over the Baltic: The Spread of Rosicrucianism in Northern Europe. Brill 1998. Limited preview online.
Caspar, Max. Kepler. Translated and edited by C. Doris Hellman. New York: Dover, 1993. Limited preview online.
Granada, M.A. "Helisaeus Röslin on the eve of the appearance of the nova of 1604: his eschatological expectations and his intellectual career as recorded in the Ratio studiorum et operum meorum (1603-1604)." Sudhoffs Archiv 90 (2006) 75-96.
 Rosen, Edward. "Kepler's Attitude toward Astrology and Mysticism." In Occult and Scientific Mentalities in the Renaissance. Edited by Brian Vickers. Cambridge University Press, 1984. Limited preview online.

1544 births
1616 deaths
16th-century apocalypticists
16th-century astrologers
16th-century German physicians
16th-century German writers
16th-century German male writers
17th-century apocalypticists
17th-century astrologers
17th-century German physicians
17th-century German writers
17th-century German male writers
16th-century German astronomers
German astrologers